Riverside is a suburban village in Cook County, Illinois, United States. A significant portion of the village is in the Riverside Landscape Architecture District, designated a National Historic Landmark in 1970. The population of the village was 9,298 at the 2020 census, up from 8,875 at the 2010 census.

History

Riverside is arguably the first planned community in the United States, designed in 1869 by Calvert Vaux and Frederick Law Olmsted. The village was incorporated in 1875. The Riverside Landscape Architecture District, an area bounded by 26th Street, Harlem and Ogden avenues, the Des Plaines River, and Golf Road, was designated a National Historic Landmark in 1970.
In 1863 the Chicago, Burlington and Quincy Railroad was built heading southwest from downtown Chicago to Quincy, Illinois, passing through what is now the Near West Suburban area of Chicago in a western-southwestern direction. This new access to transportation and commerce brought about a significant housing and construction boom in what was once farmland far from the bustle of the city of Chicago.

In 1868, an eastern businessman named Emery E. Childs formed the Riverside Improvement Company, and purchased a  tract of property along the Des Plaines River and the Chicago, Burlington and Quincy Railroad line. The site was highly desirable due to its natural oak-hickory forest and its proximity to Chicago. The company commissioned well-known landscape architect Frederick Law Olmsted and his partner, Calvert Vaux, to design a rural bedroom community. The town's plan, which was completed in 1869, called for curvilinear streets, following the land's contours and the winding Des Plaines River. The plan also accorded for a central village square, located at the main railroad station, and a Grand Park system that uses several large parks as a foundation, with 41 smaller triangular parks and plazas located at intersections throughout town to provide for additional green spaces.

The Great Chicago Fire of 1871 and the financial Panic of 1873 brought about the demise of the improvement company, bringing new construction nearly to a halt for some time. A village government was established in September 1875, and Olmsted's original development plan remained in force. Building resumed in the following years, with the opening of the Riverside Golf Club in 1893, the striking Chateauesque Riverside Township Hall in 1895, and the Burlington line train station in 1901. Many homes and estates were designed by architects such as Frank Lloyd Wright, Daniel Burnham, Louis Sullivan, William Le Baron Jenney, Joseph Lyman Silsbee, Frederick Clarke Withers, and Calvert Vaux at the time as well.

A major period of residential development came again in the 1920s and late 1930s, when many modest houses were constructed on smaller parcels. The population grew to 7,935 by 1940 and consisted primarily of small proprietors, managers, and professionals who were predominantly of Anglo-American and German American background. The remaining residential areas were developed during the post–World War II boom, and by 1960 the village was almost entirely developed. The population peaked at 10,357 in 1970 and dropped below 8,500 by the mid-1990s.

Riverside has become an architectural museum, which is recognized by the village's National Historic Landmark designation. The village housing stock varies from well-maintained 1920s bungalows and huge Victorian and early-twentieth-century mansions that attract architectural tours led by The Frederick Law Olmsted Society of Riverside. The charming village center houses several restaurants as well as coffee shops, and hosts stores selling antiques and Victorian house fixtures, reflective of the village's older affluent population. In celebration of the 2018 Illinois Bicentennial, Riverside was selected as one of the Illinois 200 Great Places  by the American Institute of Architects Illinois component (AIA Illinois).

Geography
Riverside is located at  (41.830881, -87.815981).
Bordering suburbs include North Riverside to the north, Berwyn to the east, Stickney and Forest View to the southeast, Lyons and McCook to the south, and Brookfield to the west. The Des Plaines River runs through the village along an area called Swan Pond.

Demographics

As of the 2020 census there were 9,298 people, 3,238 households, and 2,424 families residing in the village. The racial makeup of the village was 79.46% White, 1.88% African American, 0.47% Native American, 2.23% Asian, 0.01% Pacific Islander, 5.25% from other races, and 10.70% from two or more races. Hispanic or Latino of any race were 16.35% of the population.

There were 3,238 households, out of which 67.33% had children under the age of 18 living with them, 60.16% were married couples living together, 12.42% had a female householder with no husband present, and 25.14% were non-families. 22.98% of all households were made up of individuals, and 11.92% had someone living alone who was 65 years of age or older. The average household size was 3.20 and the average family size was 2.70.

The village's age distribution consisted of 25.4% under the age of 18, 6.9% from 18 to 24, 18.3% from 25 to 44, 32.1% from 45 to 64, and 17.4% who were 65 years of age or older. The median age was 44.2 years. For every 100 females, there were 90.8 males. For every 100 females age 18 and over, there were 79.5 males.

The median income for a household in the village was $120,336, and the median income for a family was $137,963. Males had a median income of $75,883 versus $56,709 for females. The per capita income for the village was $55,882. About 2.1% of families and 2.7% of the population were below the poverty line, including 2.9% of those under age 18 and 2.8% of those age 65 or over.

Government
Riverside is mostly in Illinois's 4th congressional district, with a small portion in Illinois's 3rd congressional district.

The United States Postal Service operates the Riverside Post Office at 45 East Burlington Street and the North Riverside Post Office at 7300 West 25th Street.

Education
Riverside is served by District 96 for public schools. District 96 has 4 elementary schools, and one junior high school. High school District 208 serves Riverside high school students.

The elementary schools are:
 Central Elementary School located at 61 Woodside Road
 Ames School located at 86 Southcote Road
 Blythe Park School located at 735 Leesley Road
 Hollywood School (in Brookfield) located at 3423 Hollywood Avenue

The middle school is:

 L. J. Hauser Junior High School located at 65 Woodside Road

The high school is:

 Riverside Brookfield High School, locally known as RB, is located at 160 Ridgewood Road

Private schools include:
Riverside Presbyterian Pre-School
St. Paul's Building Blocks Pre-School
St. Mary Catholic Elementary School
Tallgrass Sudbury School

Transportation 
Riverside is served by the BNSF Railway Line with a station for METRA commuter trains operating between Aurora and Chicago. Hollywood and Harlem Avenue METRA stations are nearby.

Notable people 

 Robert Todd Lincoln Beckwith, last descendant of Abraham Lincoln
 Clare Briggs, pioneering cartoonist of domestic life and creator of the first continuity daily newspaper comic strip
 Telford Burnham, lawyer, namesake and planner of Burnham, Illinois, and brother of architect Daniel Burnham
 Arthur T. Broche, Illinois state representative
 Patrick Creadon, filmmaker
 Jean Fenn, opera singer
 George Hunt, Illinois Attorney General
 Johnny "Red" Kerr, center and power forward with the Philadelphia 76ers and Baltimore Bullets; coach with the Chicago Bulls and Phoenix Suns; longtime Bulls broadcaster
 Tom Kondla, center with the Minnesota Pipers and Houston Mavericks
 Ring Lardner, newspaper and short story writer
 "Screwy" Claude Maddox, criminal ally of Al Capone
 Martin E. Marty, scholar of religion
 Frank Nitti, criminal ally of Capone
 Judy Baar Topinka, state politician; Illinois State Comptroller and Illinois State Treasurer

In popular culture
 Parts of the movie The Lake House were filmed at the Riverside train station, the former Henninger's Pharmacy, and at the Sidney Allen home at 84 Riverside Road.
 The made-for-TV movie In the Company of Darkness was filmed throughout Riverside.
 The 2004 movie Christmas with the Kranks was set in Riverside, although it was filmed in California and Canada.
Portions of Season 4 of the FX series Fargo were filmed in Riverside as a stand-in for Kansas City of the 1950s.

Business
The Central Business District, located around the Riverside Metra station, has a collection of shops, several cafes, banks, and wealth management offices.

See also
Garden city movement
Garden real estate
Riverside (Metra)
Riverside Historic District (Riverside, Illinois)

References

External links
Village of Riverside official website
The Frederick Law Olmsted Society of Riverside
Illinois Great Places - Riverside
Society of Architectural Historians SAH ARCHIPEDIA entry on Riverside

 
Villages in Illinois
Villages in Cook County, Illinois
Chicago metropolitan area
Planned cities in the United States
Populated places established in 1869
National Register of Historic Places in Cook County, Illinois
1869 establishments in Illinois